Doris Haselrieder was an Italian luger who competed in the early to mid-1990s. A natural track luger, she won the bronze medal in the women's singles event at the 1994 FIL World Luge Natural Track Championships in Gsies, Italy.

Haselrieder also won two medals in the women's singles event at the FIL European Luge Natural Track Championships with a gold in 1991 and a silver in 1993.

Her husband, Oswald, won the bronze medal in the men's doubles event at the 2006 Winter Olympics in Turin. They had a child at the end of July 2007.

References
FIL-Luge news from June 14, 2007 on the growing baby boom among Italian lugers, including Haselrieder
Natural track European Championships results 1970-2006.
Natural track World Championships results: 1979-2007
Doris Haselrieder

Italian lugers
Italian female lugers
Living people
Year of birth missing (living people)
People from Völs am Schlern
Sportspeople from Südtirol